Piz Vadret is a mountain of the Swiss Livigno Alps, located east of Samedan in the canton of Graubünden. It lies just north of Fuorcla Muragl, between the valleys of Champagna, Muragl and Prüna.

The closest access is from the funicular station at Muottas Muragl.

References

External links
 Piz Vadret on Hikr

Mountains of the Alps
Mountains of Switzerland
Alpine three-thousanders
Mountains of Graubünden
Pontresina
S-chanf
Zernez